Four-Star Spectacular was an anthology comic book series published by DC Comics in the mid-1970s. The series was edited by E. Nelson Bridwell and ran for six issues from March/April 1976 to January/February 1977. The books were in the "giant size" format and consisted mostly of superhero reprints, with some new material. A total of four characters from DC's roster of superheroes appeared in each issue — hence the title. Half of the title's issues, however, only featured three stories. Each issue featured a Superboy story, a Wonder Woman story, and at least one other story (usually a team-up story). All issues featured cover art by DC artist Ernie Chua.

The issues

In other media

Television
The name "Four-Star Spectacular" was used as the title of an episode on the animated television show Batman: The Brave and the Bold. The episode emulated the "Four Star Spectacular" concept: it contained four segments starring heroes who had previously appeared on the show (i.e., Adam Strange in "Worlds War", Flash in "Double Jeopardy", 'Mazing Man in "Kitty Catastrophe" and the Creature Commandos in "The War That Time Forgot"). Batman appeared in each segment as a secondary character and/or in cameo appearance.

See also
 DC Super Stars
 DC Special Series
 DC Special
 List of DC Comics publications

References

External links
 
 Library of Congress listing

1976 comics debuts
DC Comics titles